The 1962 Northwestern Wildcats team represented Northwestern University during the 1962 Big Ten Conference football season. In their seventh year under head coach Ara Parseghian, the Wildcats compiled a 7–2 record (4–2 against Big Ten Conference opponents) and finished in third place in the Big Ten Conference. The Wildcats were ranked #1 in the AP Poll before losing consecutive games late in the season against #2-ranked Wisconsin and Michigan State.

The team's offensive leaders were quarterback Tom Myers with 1,537 passing yards, Willie Stinson with 418 rushing yards, and halfback/end Paul Flatley with 626 receiving yards. Center Jack Cvercko was a consensus first-team All-American.

Schedule

Players
 Jack Cvercko – guard (consensus 1st-team All-American; 1st-team All-Big Ten selection by AP and UPI)
 Paul Flatley – halfback/end (3rd-team All-America selection by The Sporting News; 2nd-team All-Big Ten selection by AP and UPI)
 Tom Myers – quarterback (3rd-team All-America selection by AFCA)

References

Northwestern
Northwestern Wildcats football seasons
Northwestern Wildcats football